David Carl Janetzki (born 28 June 1978) is an Australian politician. He was elected to the Queensland Legislative Assembly representing the seat of Toowoomba South for the Liberal National Party at a Toowoomba South state by-election in July 2016.

Janetzki was appointed Deputy Leader of the Opposition, Shadow Treasurer and Shadow Minister for Investment and Trade in November 2020. He previously held the positions of Shadow Attorney-General and Shadow Minister for Justice from December 2017 to October 2020. In February 2022, he announced he would step down as Deputy Leader of the Opposition, effective in March 2022, but retain his other shadow portfolios, due to "family challenges" in the past few years.

Early life 
Janetzki was born in Toowoomba and raised on the family dairy farm between Brymaroo and Jondaryan, located on the Darling Downs. His German ancestors settled the Darling Downs in the late 1800s.

His father is a stalwart of the agriculture show movement and is currently the Darling Downs Sub-Chamber President.

Education 
Janetzki attended small country schools including Acland State School (alma mater of Alan Jones) and Jondaryan State School (alma mater of Toowoomba South predecessor John McVeigh).

He graduated from Concordia Lutheran College where he had been School Captain, Head Boarder Boy and First XI Cricket Captain.

He has economics and law degrees (honours) from the University of Queensland. He also hold an A.Mus.A (Piano).

Career before Parliament 
Janetzki worked at Brisbane law firm ClarkeKann, Corrs Chambers Westgarth and in London with the Manpower Group. He specialised in commercial law and litigation. Upon returning home to Toowoomba in 2007, he served as Heritage Bank's General Counsel and Company Secretary.

He was a finalist in the 2010 Australian Young Inhouse Lawyer of the Year and was recognised in 2015 as one of Australia's leading inhouse banking and finance lawyers by the Doyle's Guide.

In 2014, Janetzki was appointed to the Board of Opera Queensland.

He also served as the independent Chairman of the Southern Downs Regional Council Audit and Risk Management Committee.

Personal 
Janetzki is married and has three children. His wife Melinda (van der Meulen) is a coloratura operatic soprano who has performed at the Sydney Opera House and for European opera companies.

Community Interests 
Janetzki regularly promotes social enterprise and, prior to his election, was a director of the Vanguard Laundry Services project in Toowoomba. The project and its founder, social entrepreneur Luke Terry, won the Capital Impact Award at the 2016 Australian Social Enterprise Awards.

Janetzki also worked with many local community organisations including the Empire Theatres Foundation (Deputy Chairman), the Toowoomba Chamber of Commerce and Industry (Director) and the Salem/Northridge aged care facility.

References

1978 births
Living people
Members of the Queensland Legislative Assembly
Liberal National Party of Queensland politicians
21st-century Australian politicians
Australian people of German descent
Deputy opposition leaders